The Online Film Critics Society Award for Best Picture is an annual film award given by the Online Film Critics Society to honor the best picture of the year.

Winners and nominees

1990s

2000s

2010s

2020s

Awards for best film

Lists of films by award